The Arena Lublin is a football stadium located in Lublin, Poland. It is the home ground of Motor Lublin. The stadium holds 15,243 people.

History
On September 2, 2011, the Budimex company signed an investment contract. Budimex undertook to build a stadium for PLN 136,207 by September 2013, and the first visuals and work schedule appeared 3–4 weeks from the date of signing the contract. The stadium was designed by the award-winning Estudio Lamela architectural office, which in the early 1990s prepared plans to modernize and enlarge Santiago Bernabéu Stadium in Madrid and designed the new Cracovia stadium. The main construction works were planned to start in the spring of 2012, but later the city decided to redesign the facility so as to increase the commercial space for lease. The first shovel on the construction site was driven in December 2012, and the final construction date was June 2014.

In the first football match at Arena Lublin, played on October 9, 2014, the Polish and Italian teams u-20 faced, as Poland won 2–1, and Mariusz Stępiński scored the first historic goal at the new stadium. The game was watched by 13,850 viewers.

The first match for points was played on October 25, 2014, where two clubs from Lublin faced each other in the Lublin-Podkarpackie III liga championship game: Motor and Lublinianka. The match ended with the score 1–1, and the first historic goal in the match of club teams was scored by Lublinianka's captain, Erwin Sobiech in the 45th minute of the match. The game was watched by 6,500 spectators. It was also the city's first derby played under artificial lighting.

It hosted the 2019–20 Polish Cup final game. It was be the arena for the 2020–21 final as well.

International events

It was one of the venues for the 2019 FIFA U-20 World Cup.

On 24 March 2021, the 2022 FIFA World Cup qualification match Estonia vs Czech Republic was played in the stadium, due to COVID-19 pandemic restrictions in Estonia.

Motor matches with the highest attendance

See also
List of football stadiums in Poland

References

Sports venues completed in 2014
Buildings and structures in Lublin
2014 establishments in Poland
Football venues in Poland
Sports venues in Lublin Voivodeship
American football venues in Poland